Curtis Alexander Reid (16 July 1836 – 1 July 1886) was an Australian cricketer and umpire who umpired the historic first Test match in Melbourne in 1877.

Family
Reid was born to Scottish immigrants Lieutenant-Doctor David Reid, RN, and his wife Agnes née Dyce. His brothers included pastoralists and politicians Robert and David. Reid married Sophie Dight (1843–1923) on 14 August 1862. Their son, Curtis Arthur Reid (1876–1912), a surveyor, played Australian rules football at the highest level in Perth (with Rovers Football Club and East Fremantle Football Club) and in Melbourne (with Melbourne Football Club).

Life and career
Reid umpired the inaugural Test between Australia and England in Melbourne on 15 to 19 March 1877.  His umpiring colleague was Ben Terry.

Earlier, as a player, Reid was a left-hand batsman and right-arm bowler who played three matches for Victoria from 1869 to 1871.  He took 16 wickets at an average of 10.87, with figures of 6 for 64 and 6 for 5 against Tasmania in 1870-71. Less successful with the bat, he scored 12 runs in 5 innings.

He was a winemaker, producing wine at Tarrawingee, Victoria, under the Reidsdale label, until 1874.

Reid was appointed secretary of the Melbourne Cricket Club in 1878, the club's first secretary to be paid. He was also one of the first cricket journalists in Australia.

See also
List of Test cricket umpires
List of Victoria first-class cricketers

References

External links
 

Australian Test cricket umpires
Australian cricketers
Victoria cricketers
1836 births
1886 deaths
Melbourne Cricket Club cricketers
Cricketers from New South Wales
Australian winemakers
Australian people of Scottish descent